Jacob Nii Martey Akrong (born December 31, 1992) is a Ghanaian footballer who plays for Mosta in Malta as a centre-back.

References

External links
Jacob Akrong at Ascenso MX

Jacob Akrong at La Preferente

1992 births
Living people
Ghanaian footballers
Ghanaian expatriate footballers
Association football defenders
Footballers from Accra
Liberty Professionals F.C. players
Udinese Calcio players
Club Recreativo Granada players
Cádiz CF B players
CD San Roque de Lepe footballers
CD Guadalajara (Spain) footballers
UD Almería B players
CF Badalona players
Club Atlético Zacatepec players
Palamós CF footballers
Atlético Morelia players
Mosta F.C. players
Maltese Premier League players
Segunda División B players
Ascenso MX players
Ghanaian expatriate sportspeople in Italy
Ghanaian expatriate sportspeople in Spain
Ghanaian expatriate sportspeople in Mexico
Ghanaian expatriate sportspeople in Malta
Expatriate footballers in Italy
Expatriate footballers in Spain
Expatriate footballers in Mexico
Expatriate footballers in Malta